Ross Tower is a 45-story high-rise in Downtown Dallas, Texas. Originally named Lincoln Plaza, the building was renamed to Ross Tower in September 2013. The building rises to a height of 579 feet (176 m) and was completed in 1984. Currently, it is the 14th-tallest building in the city.

Major tenants
At one time Halliburton had its headquarters in Lincoln Plaza. As of 2002 20 employees worked in the building. Halliburton planned to move its headquarters to Houston in 2002. Halliburton was scheduled to move to 5 Houston Center in Downtown Houston in 2003.

Gallery

See also

List of tallest buildings in Dallas

References

External links

Skyscraper office buildings in Dallas
Downtown Dallas
1982 establishments in Texas
Office buildings completed in 1982
HKS, Inc. buildings
Leadership in Energy and Environmental Design basic silver certified buildings